Marko Kraljević (born 1 November 1965) is a former German-Croat footballer and current coach.

Club career
Marko Kraljević played in the Malaysian Premier League for Kelantan. and Hong Kong Rangers in 1995. He won the Hong Kong Senior Shield and Hong Kong FA Cup in the successful season of 1994–95. Next, he travelled to Singapore to play in the S.League during its early years for Balestier Central, and later with Tampines Rovers and Jurong FC as a striker.

Coaching career
After he retired, Marko started off his coaching career with the Balestier Khalsa Centre of Excellence under-16 team, working his way up to become the head coach of the Prime League team for the Tigers. He then moved to become the Prime League coach of Woodlands Wellington in 2012. Marko returned to Balestier as head coach for their 2014 S.League season. He quickly transformed the team into one of the toughest in the League, winning the club's first ever Singapore Cup and awarded the S.League Coach of the Year at the end of that season.
Led Balestier Khalsa in the AFC Cup in 2015, along the way, they won 2013 AFC Cup semi finalist, East Bengal 2–1. With limited resource in 2016, Marko still able produce some positive results, beating Dhivehi Premier League champions, New Radiant 3–0 and held them 2–2 away from home before winning Hong Kong Premier League winners 1–0 at Jalan Besar Stadium as the underdog. End the season with a fourth place in the Singapore Cup.

After five years with Balestier Khalsa, where he becomes the longest serving head coach of the Tigers, Kraljevic was appointed as new head coach of Kelantan FA in January 2019, returning to the team he has played for in the 1990s. However, his contract was terminated on April the same year, with Kelantan occupying the relegation spot in 2019 Malaysia Premier League.

Marko is currently the head of youth at Hougang United Football Club, leading the coaching responsibility for the club's U-21 side.

Honours

Player
Hong Kong Rangers
 Hong Kong Senior Shield: 1994–95
 Hong Kong FA Cup: 1994–95

Manager
Balestier Khalsa
 Singapore Cup: 2014
 League Cup: 2015 (Runner-up)
 League Cup Plate Tournament: 2014 (Runner-up)
 Community Shield: 2015 (Runner-up)

Individual
 S.League Coach of the Year: 2014

Personal life
Marko is also the successful joint-owner of the Stadio futsal facilities found around Singapore together with V. Sundramoorthy.

He is married to a Singaporean wife and has two children.

References

External links
Former tiger returns as coach

1965 births
Living people
Footballers from Düsseldorf
German people of Croatian descent
Association football midfielders
Yugoslav footballers
Croatian footballers
NK Osijek players
Kelantan FA players
Hong Kong Rangers FC players
Balestier Khalsa FC players
Tampines Rovers FC players
Jurong FC players
Yugoslav First League players
Singapore Premier League players
Croatian expatriate footballers
Expatriate footballers in Malaysia
Croatian expatriate sportspeople in Malaysia
Expatriate footballers in Singapore
Croatian expatriate sportspeople in Singapore
Expatriate footballers in Hong Kong
Croatian expatriate sportspeople in Hong Kong
Croatian football managers
Balestier Khalsa FC head coaches
Singapore Premier League head coaches
Croatian expatriate football managers
Expatriate football managers in Singapore
Expatriate football managers in Malaysia